The FIBA Africa Championship 2009 Qualification occurred on various dates between 4 August 2008 and 31 May 2009. It was used to determine which African national basketball teams would qualify for the FIBA Africa Championship 2009. Teams competed with other teams in their respective "zones" for a spot in the Championship tournament.

Qualified Teams
Four teams qualified for the tournament before the qualification round took place.  Ten more teams claimed spots in the tournament through Zonal Qualifying.  One wildcard spot was reserved prior to the qualification round; because no team from Zone 7 registered, FIBA Africa gave out a second wildcard.

Qualified as the host nation:
 

Qualified by finishing in the top three at the 2007 FIBA Africa Championship:
 
 
 

Qualified through Zonal Qualifying:
 
 
 
 
 
 
 
 
 
 

Qualified via Wildcard Invitation:

Qualifying round
Zone 1 (Salé, Morocco, 24–29 May 2009) 

Qualified before tournament: (host)

Zone 2 (Bamako, Mali, 15–17 May 2009)

Did not enter:, 
Qualified before tournament:

Zone 3 (Yamoussoukro, Côte d'Ivoire, 4–10 August 2008) 

Did not enter:, 

Zone 4 (Bangui, Central African Republic, 26–31 May 2009) 

Did not enter:, 
Qualified before tournament:

Zone 5 (Kigali, Rwanda, 23 February - 1 March 2009) 

Did not enter:, 

Zone 6 (Maputo, Mozambique, 30 March - 4 April 2009) 

Did not enter:, 
Qualified before qualifying tournament:

Zone 7 (Mauritius, TBD)

Tournament was not held as no Zone 7 team met the registration deadline.

Did not enter:,

References
2009 FIBA Africa Championship Preliminary Round at FIBA Archive

AfroBasket qualification
2008 in African basketball
2009 in African basketball
qualification